The voiced epiglottal affricate ( in IPA) is a rare affricate consonant that is initiated as an epiglottal stop  and released as a voiced epiglottal fricative . It has not been reported to occur phonemically in any language.

Features 
Features of the voiced epiglottal affricate:

Occurrence

Notes

References 

 

Affricates
Pulmonic consonants
Voiced oral consonants
Central consonants